Phthorarcha is a genus of moths in the family Geometridae described by Edward Meyrick in 1892.

Species
 Phthorarcha ishkovi Viidalepp, 1986
 Phthorarcha primigena Staudinger, 1895

References

Oenochrominae